Linus Tongwo Asong  was a novelist from the British Southern Cameroons. Born in 1947 in Lewoh (Fotabong) in the former British Southern Cameroons at the end of the Second World War, he became known as an intellectual, novelist, painter, literary critic, publisher and comedian. He died at Mbingo Hospital on Monday, July 16, 2012 at about 1:00 p.m. WAT. He had just retired from the University of Bamenda in June 2012 and was about to take up a position as a Dean at the Catholic University of Cameroon, Bamenda. He also worked with his nephew, Januarius Jingwa Asongu to get Saint Monica University off the ground, a project that his daughter, Laura Asong, helped bring to reality. He was married to Teresa Ajab Asong and had three children - Laura, Stephen, and Edward.

Education 
After primary education, he was admitted into the St. Joseph's College, Sasse (Buea), where he earned the General Certificate of Education (GCE) Ordinary Level before proceeding to the Cameroon College of Arts, Science and Technology (CCAST) Bambili, where he earned the GCE Advanced Level. After high school, he was admitted into the University of Cape Coast, Ghana, where he did a degree in Education, specializing in the teaching of English. Upon his return to the Cameroons, he taught in French-speaking Cameroun for a few years before earning a scholarship to study creative arts in Canada following an exhibition of his paintings in Yaounde. In Canada, he studied at the University of Windsor, where he earned a Master of Fine Arts (MFA) in Creative Writing. He then enrolled at the University of Alberta, where he earned an MA and a PhD in Comparative Literature. He returned to Cameroon in 1984 and began teaching English Literature at E.N.S Annexe, Bambili, a branch of the University of Yaounde I, which later became part of the University of Bamenda.

Works 
L.T. Asong wrote several books, mostly novels, including:
 The Akroma File
 Chopchair
 The Crabs of Bangui
 The Crown of Thorns

 Detective Fiction and The African Scene
 Doctor Frederick Ngenito
 Laughing Store
 A Legend of the Dead
 Ndeh Ntumazah
 No Way to Die
 Osagyefo. The Great Betrayal
 Psychological Constructs and the Craft of African Fiction of Yesteryears
 Salvation Colony
 A Stranger in his Homeland

References

1947 births
2012 deaths
Cameroonian novelists
Cameroonian educators
Southern Cameroons
Male novelists
20th-century novelists
21st-century novelists
20th-century male writers
21st-century male writers